John P. Gardner (1922 – August 20, 1994) was a judge of a special South Carolina Court of Appeals created to alleviate the burden of cases from the South Carolina Supreme Court from 1980 to 1993.

Born in Darlington, South Carolina, Gardner attended Wofford College and served in the United States Air Force during World War II, from 1943 to 1945, before receiving an LL.B. from the University of South Carolina in 1948. He served in the South Carolina House of Representatives from 1959 to 1966.

Due to a backlog in appellate cases in the state, the legislature established a court to handle the excess, with appellate jurisdiction over criminal and family court cases:

Because a state statute "prohibited a legislator from holding a position created by the Legislature in which he sat", the state Supreme Court had to determine that "Gardner, one of the five judges-elect, was eligible to serve because he was not a legislator at the time of his election". As further explained:

Gardner retired from the court in 1993, and was succeeded by Judge Carol Connor. One of Gardner's law clerks was Trey Gowdy, who would later become a member of the United States House of Representatives.

References

1922 births
1994 deaths
People from Darlington, South Carolina
Wofford College alumni
University of South Carolina School of Law alumni
Members of the South Carolina House of Representatives
Justices of the South Carolina Supreme Court
20th-century American politicians
20th-century American judges
United States Army Air Forces personnel of World War II